John D'Arco Sr. (March 27, 1912October 27, 1994) was an  American politician, who was involved in organized political corruption, illegal gambling and prostitution activities in Chicago, Illinois, US.

Early life

D'Arco was born in Chicago, Illinois, on March 27, 1912 to parents of Italian ancestry. Growing up in the Near West Side, he allegedly developed connections with street gangs in Chicago's Little Italy, during the 1920s.

Rise to power and politics

By 1951, D'Arco had already become a powerful Democratic ward boss of the 1st Ward and, in 1945, he was a Democratic Committeeman, as well. He also served in the Illinois House of Representatives from 1945 to 1952 as a Democrat. He was known for providing protection to the Chicago criminal gangs, including the Chicago Outfit, and participating in a variety of criminal activities, ranging from organized corruption of city officials to prostitution.

Later years, investigations, and death

During the 1970s, D'Arco was investigated by the US federal government for his alleged involvement in an attempt to fix the 1977 murder trial of reputed hitman Harry Aleman, but he was never indicted. D'Arco died in Chicago, Illinois.

References

See also
John A. D'Arco Jr., D'Arco's son, also a prominent Illinois politician

1912 births
1994 deaths
20th-century American politicians
American political bosses from Illinois
American gangsters of Italian descent
Chicago City Council members
Democratic Party members of the Illinois House of Representatives
Politicians from Chicago